Racism in the Arab world covers an array of forms of intolerance against non-Arabs and the expat majority of the Arab states of the Persian Gulf coming from (Sri Lanka, Pakistan, India and Bangladesh) groups as well as Black, European, and Asian groups that are Muslim; non-Arab ethnic minorities such as Armenians, Africans, the Saqaliba, Southeast Asians, Jews, Kurds, and Coptic Christians, Assyrians, Persians and other Iranic peoples, Turks, Turkmens and other Turkic peoples, and South Asians living in Arab countries of the Middle East.

The previously taboo topics of race and racism in the Arab world have been explored more since the rise of foreign, private and independent media. In one example, Al-Jazeera's critical coverage of the Darfur crisis led to the arrest and conviction of its Khartoum bureau chief.

History

Medieval Arab attitudes to Black people varied over time and individual attitude, but tended to be negative. Though the Qur'an expresses no racial prejudice, ethnocentric prejudice towards black people is widely evident among medieval Arabs, for a variety of reasons: their extensive conquests and slave trade; the influence of Aristotelian ideas regarding slavery, which some Muslim philosophers directed towards Zanj and the influence of Judeo-Christian ideas regarding divisions among humankind. On the other hand, the Afro-Arab author Al-Jahiz, himself having a Zanj grandfather, wrote a book entitled Superiority of the Blacks to the Whites, and explained why the Zanj were black in terms of environmental determinism in the "On the Zanj" chapter of The Essays. By the 14th century, a significant number of slaves came from either West or Central Africa; Lewis argues that this led to the likes of Egyptian historian Al-Abshibi (1388–1446) writing that "[i]t is said that when the [black] slave is sated, he fornicates, when he is hungry, he steals."

Ethnocentrism
According to Ali Ibn Abi Talib, the Prophet said, "God divided the earth in two halves and placed (me) in the better of the two, then He divided the half in three parts, and I was in the best of them, then He chose the Arabs from among the people, then He chose the Quraysh from among the Arabs, then He chose the children of ‘Abd al-Muttalib from among the Banu Hashim, then he chose me from among the children of ‘Abd al-Muttalib, and from them he chose me."

According to Abu Huraira, Prophet Muhammad said, "People are subservient to the Quraish: the Muslims among them being subservient to the Muslims among them, and the disbelievers among the people being subservient to the disbelievers among them."(Sahih Muslim 20:4473)

"A man married a maid-slave who bore him a child. Would that child be free or would he be an owned slave?" "Her child whom she bore from him would be the property of her master according to all the Imams (heads of the four Islamic schools of law) because the child follows the (status) of his mother in freedom or slavery. If the child is not of the race of Arabs, then he is definitely an owned slave according to the scholars, but the scholars disputed (his status) among themselves if he was from the Arabs, whether he must be enslaved or not because when A'isha (Muhammad's wife) had a maid-slave who was an Arab, Muhammad said to A'isha, `Set this maid free because she is from the children of Ishmael[Arabs].'"(Ibn Taymiyyah, volume 31, page 376-377)

According to Dr. Michael Penn:

Racist attitudes
The Guardian’s journalist, Brian Whitaker, wrote on the race taboo in the Arab World; an excerpt: Racism is a worldwide phenomenon. In some countries it's met with disapproval, in others with denial. The A to Z of ethnic and religious groups in the Middle East embraces Alawites, Armenians, Assyrians, Baháʼís, Berbers, Copts, Druzes, Ibadis, Ismailis, Jews, Kurds, Maronites, Sahrawis, Tuareq, Turkmens, Yazidis and Zaidis and Nubians (by no means an exhaustive list), and yet serious discussion of ethnic/religious diversity and its place in society is a long-standing taboo.
If the existence of non-Arab or non-Muslim groups is acknowledged at all, it is usually only to declare how wonderfully everyone gets along.

Mona Eltahawy, a columnist for Egypt's Al Masry Al Youm and Qatar's Al Arab, wrote in the New York Times an article titled, "Racism: The Arab world's dirty secret". She was a witness to racist attacks by Arab Egyptians on blacks and stated: "We are a racist people in Egypt and we are in deep denial about it. On my Facebook page, I blamed racism for my argument and an Egyptian man wrote to deny that we are racists and used as his proof a program on Egyptian Radio featuring Sudanese songs and poetry! Our silence over racism not only destroys the warmth and hospitality we are proud of as Egyptians, it has deadly consequences." She believed racism was behind a police crackdown on 5,000 Sudanese refugees and the beating to death of some women and children. She added: "The racism I saw on the Cairo Metro has an echo in the Arab world at large, where the suffering in Darfur goes ignored because its victims are black and because those who are creating the misery in Darfur are not Americans or Israelis and we only pay attention when America and Israel behave badly." She criticized the country's attitudes: "We love to cry 'Islamophobia' when we talk about the way Muslim minorities are treated in the West and yet we never stop to consider how we treat minorities and the most vulnerable among us." While noting that racist incidents are condemned in the United States, she said that in Egypt, as well as in the Arab world, there is a culture of silence toward racist incidents which reflects negatively on Arab society.

Accusations against specific Arab governments

Iraq

According to a statement by Fred Halliday, the Ba'athists in Iraq were inspired by Sati' al-Husri and with rhetoric tinged with pan-Arabism and anti-Iranian sentiment. In the decade and a half after the Ba'ath party came to power, up to 200,000 Feyli Kurds were expelled from Iraq. In claiming to be  "defenders of Arabism", Halliday asserts the Ba'ath promoted a myth of Persian migrants and communities in the Persian Gulf region to be comparable to "Zionists" settling Palestine.

Mauritania
According to Holly Burkhalter of Human Rights Watch, in a statement made in testimony before the Congress of the United States, "It is fair to say that the Mauritanian government practices undeclared apartheid and severely discriminates on the basis of race."

Sudan

Beginning in 1991, elders of the Zaghawa people of Sudan complained that they were victims of an intensifying Arab apartheid campaign. Vukoni Lupa Lasaga has accused the Sudanese government of "deftly manipulat(ing) Arab solidarity" to carry out policies of apartheid and ethnic cleansing against non-Arabs in Darfur. Alan Dershowitz has pointed to Sudan as an example of a government that deserves the appellation "apartheid", and former Canadian Minister of Justice Irwin Cotler has also criticized Sudan in similar terms.

Egypt
Black Egyptian President Anwar Sadat faced insults of not looking "Egyptian enough" and "Nasser's black poodle". An Egyptian Nubian soccer player Shikabala stopped playing football for some time due to racist slurs by rival Egyptian fans during a game. A group was shouting out "Shikabala" while pointing a black dog wearing the number 10, which was Zamalek football shirt.

According to the Egyptian Initiative for Personal Rights (EIPR), Black African immigrants to Egypt often face physical violence and verbal abuse at the hands of the general public and law enforcement officials. Refugees from Sudan are especially targeted, with racial slurs like "oonga boonga" and "samara" (meaning "black") constituting the most typical insults. The EIPR attributes the violence and abuse to both a lack of government efforts at disseminating information, raising awareness and dispelling myths with regard to the economic contributions made by the newcomers, and stereotyping on the part of the Egyptian media. Black women are also targets of sexual harassment. As a remedy, the EIPR recommends that the Egyptian government "should intensify and accelerate efforts to combat racist xenophobic views towards migrant workers, especially those of Black African origin, and to promote awareness of their positive contribution to society. The government should train all personnel working in the field of criminal justice and law enforcement officials in the spirit of respect for human rights and non-discrimination on ethnic or racial grounds."

Maghreb (Morocco, Tunisia, Algeria, and Libya)
In March 2011, officials from the United Nations High Commissioner for Refugees confirmed allegations of discrimination by Tunisia against black Africans. Black Africans were reportedly targeted by rebel forces during the Libyan civil war in 2011.

Ideology
Author draws parallel between Arab nationalism and Turkish nationalism, both were "likewise evolving into the "racial" stage, the ideal being a great "Pan-Arab" empire, embracing not merely the ethnically Arab peninsula-homeland, but also the regions of Mesopotamia, The Levant, Egypt, Tripoli, North Africa and the Sudan."

Dr. Walid Phares writes about Arabism's denial of identity of millions of indigenous non-Arab nations as an ethnic cleansing on a politico-cultural level.

A writer on the Durban conference regarding racism suggests: That stressing out that "Arabism is racism" would have been an interesting debating topic. Yet, he adds that "the OIC
countries were very clever in how they deflected the slavery issue that could so easily have been turned on them with a vengeance."

Some Muslim activists have also expressed that "Arabism is racism, pure and simple." There was Sheikh Mustafa al-Maraghi, who in a famous 1938 essay dismissed the goal of [pan] Arab unity as racist.

Arab Muslim authors in "Arab-Iranian relations": Much ink has flowed on the issue of Arab nationalism. Some people believe it to be a racist movement, advocating the superiority of the Arabs.

A Muslim scholar writes that "the Ba'th party, which sowed a Pan-Arabist ideology, was responsible for the genocide of Kurdish people in Iraq as well as the genocide of Shiite Arabs in Iraq, and that "Pan-Arabism does not recognize minorities living in the Arab world. Everybody in this "world" is an Arab."

Ali A. Allawi, the former Iraqi Minister of Defense and Finance, envisioning a peaceful Iraq: "Arabism, racism and sectarianism – would be dethroned. Iraq would be at peace with itself and with its region."

In 1960's, the French Comite d' Action de Defense De- mocratique published a pamphlet titled Racism and Pan-Arabism, its introduction followed by an article by the well known French sociologist, anthropologist & political leader: Jackes Soustelle to fight against all kinds of racism, this was followed by a paper by Shlomo Friedrich on "Pan-Arabism: A New Racist Menace?" who offered a sharp critique of Nasser's book The Philosophy of the Revolution, and it terms it a mere pale imitation of Hitler's Mein Kampf.

The African Liberation Forces of Mauritania speaking on slavery and genocide in the Sahel, said "those two governments [Sudan and Mauritania] went to the same school—the school of Arabization. The professor was Saddam Hussein, and the doctrine was developed in Egypt by Nasser. They follow the pattern of Ba'athism and Nasserism. In the color of their skin they may not be Arabs, they may be Black. But they want to be Arab, and they follow this policy of Arabization in Mauritania and Sudan."

Racism – overview

In an interview 'White Skin, Black Mask' the Tunisian-born, Algerian author Kamel Riahi explained:
"It might come as a surprise to you to learn that Negro was the term people called my black grandfather. I consider myself as someone of a Negro descent, although I am not black. Perhaps my wide nose proves this theory. Therefore, I am sympathetic towards the blacks ideologically, by heritage and by history. We, the whites, will not be liberated until we liberate ourselves from the racist views we have of other races and religions."
He goes on in denouncing the massive common racism in the Arab world:

We still curse each other using "you’re Jewish" or "you’re Kurdish", this is also racial and religious discrimination. Watch any Egyptian sitcom and tell me about the image of the Sudanese character. Listen to the Tunisian jokes about the Libyans or jokes about people from Hums in Greater Syria. Listen to the debates regarding noble families and family lineage… even horses now are divided between what is considered "noble" and what is not. We are racists to the bones. Attempting to hide or silence this fact will not help with the matter because we are a sick society which still suffers from the complexes of color and race.

Some charge that "ultra-Arabism and Jihadism have been responsible for widespread persecution and genocide." such Saddam's using chemical weapons and gas against the Kurds during the bombings of Halabja in northern Iraq. "The Kurds, a non-Arab people whose language belongs to the Iranian group, have suffered from persecution under the Baath of Iraq and Syria, especially since the departure of British and French forces in the late 1940s." (Kurds are also claiming rights in Iran and Turkey.) The Berbers, the pre-Arab native peoples of North Africa, have been victimized by the Arabs in North Africa.

Kurds decried 'Arab racism' against them, and have branded "The Arab League as a useless ideological racist Arabist institution."

There're historic racial divisions, racial and religious prejudices in Iraq, including on Kurds, on Shia and the Marsh Arabs.

Affected victims
In Sudan, including the Nuba Mountains and the Blue Nile region, from 1955 to 2005, it is estimated that nearly 4 million black people were killed or ethnically cleansed. During the Second Sudanese Civil War, about 2.5 million people were killed in attacks widely regarded as racially motivated against black indigenous Africans.

Racism has been documented in Libya, including the 2000 anti-African racist violence. They have reported facing racism in the country, with one witness reporting being called a "slave" and "animal." From the start of Libyan Civil War in 2011, blacks were massacred for their skin color according to an Amnesty International report.

In Algeria victims of racism include Sub-Saharan immigrants who suffer daily from verbal attacks and other forms of discrimination. Many Sub-Saharan immigrants find themselves on the street due to lack of public resources. The homeless immigrants often quote the Quran in an effort to appeal to the country's Muslim unity and divert attention from their race. On the world stage the country has declared that members of its national football team must undergo a stricter selection process if they possess dual citizenship to ensure their loyalty to the country.

Some of the persecuted victims of racism and discrimination in the Arab world include: Sub-Saharan Africans in Egypt, including on Eritreans, and oppressing Darfurian refugees, Algeria, Mauritania – fighting off racist policies in these countries, in Iraq where blacks face racism, Kurds in Syria and in Iraq, Copts,

it worsened under pan-Arabism by Nasser and with the empowerment of the Muslim Brotherhood. Al-Akhdam in Yemen, as well as slaves who fight the stigma of their status as 'slaves' in impoverished Yemen, Persians' historic struggle against the 'Arab supremacy,' Berbers in North Africa (Moroccos, Algeria, Tunisia, Libya ), South Asians and Southeast Asians (migrant workers and maids in the Gulf Arab nations), Jews (see: Antisemitism in the Arab world, in a 2009 PEW poll, 90% of the Middle East were found to view Jews unfavorably). Although slavery was officially abolished in 1981, a 2012 CNN report suggested that 10% to 20% of the Mauritanian population was enslaved with a correlation with skin color – darker-skinned Mauritanians were often enslaved by lighter-skinned.

See also

 Antisemitism in the Arab world
 Antisemitism in Islam
 Geography of antisemitism
 Racism by country
 Racism in Africa
 Racism in Asia
 Racism in Mauritania
 Racism in the Middle East

References

 
Arab
Arab world